The 2015 Unibet European Championship was the eighth edition of the Professional Darts Corporation tournament, the European Championship, which saw the top European players compete against the highest ranked players from the PDC Order of Merit. The tournament took place from 30 October–1 November 2015 at the Ethias Arena in Hasselt, Belgium.

Michael van Gerwen was the defending champion, having beaten Terry Jenkins 11–4 in the final of the 2014 tournament, and he retained his title by overcoming Gary Anderson 11–10, having trailed 10-7. It was the first time Van Gerwen had successfully defended a major title.

Prize money
The 2015 European Championship had a total prize fund of £300,000, a £50,000 increase since the previous staging of the tournament. The following is the breakdown of the fund:

Qualification
The top 16 players from the PDC Order of Merit on 19 October automatically qualified for the event. The top eight non-qualified players from the Pro Tour Order of Merit were added to the tournament. The remaining places were filled by European qualifiers, with the top seven players from the European Order of Merit and a Scandinavian qualifier. The top eight from the PDC Order of Merit were seeded in the tournament.

These were the participants:

Draw
The draw was held on 20 October 2015.

Broadcasting
On 14 June 2013, the PDC announced that the European Championship would be broadcast in the United Kingdom on ITV4 for the next three years. The tournament was available in the following countries on these channels:

References

European Championship (darts)
European Championship
European Championship
Sport in Hasselt